The Karaali Rocks are a small group of rocks along the east side of the mainly snow-covered Coulter Heights,  east of Matikonis Peak in Marie Byrd Land, Antarctica. They were mapped by the United States Geological Survey from surveys and U.S. Navy air photos, 1959–65, and were named by the Advisory Committee on Antarctic Names for Atok Karaali, an ionospheric physicist at Plateau Station, 1968.

References

Rock formations of Marie Byrd Land